The Nissan Sway is a hatchback concept car exhibited by Nissan Motors in 2015 at the Geneva Motor Show.

The car features Nissan's V-motion grille, boomerang tail-lamps, floating roof design and glass roof with 'X' crossing structure in the middle. The dashboard of Nissan Sway was inspired by the Nissan IDx concept.

References

Sway